Eduardo José Escobar (born January 5, 1989) is a Venezuelan professional baseball third baseman for the New York Mets of Major League Baseball (MLB). He previously played in MLB for the Chicago White Sox,  Minnesota Twins, Arizona Diamondbacks and Milwaukee Brewers.

Early life
Escobar grew up in the neighborhood of La Pica in Palo Negro in the Venezuelan state of Aragua with his four siblings. They were raised by a single mother. Escobar began working a job at seven years old and was only able to get an education through the eighth grade.

Professional career

Chicago White Sox
Escobar was a September call-up in 2011, playing in nine games and had two hits in seven at bats. In 2012, Escobar made the 25-man roster out of spring training as a utility infielder. In his first 97 plate appearances of 2012, Escobar had a .207 batting average with three runs batted in (RBIs).

Minnesota Twins

On July 28, 2012, Escobar was traded to the Minnesota Twins with Pedro Hernández for Francisco Liriano. In 49 more plate appearances, Escobar batted .227 with six RBIs. Overall in 2012, Escobar had 146 total plate appearances with a .214 average and nine RBIs.

On April 3, 2013, Escobar hit a walk-off 2-run double off of Phil Coke that lifted the Twins past the Detroit Tigers, 3-2, to its first win of the 2013 season. On April 9, 2013, Escobar hit his first career home run in the top of the 5th inning off of Jeremy Guthrie of the Kansas City Royals. Playing 66 games in 2013, Escobar batted .236 with three home runs, and 10 RBIs.

In 2014, Escobar batted .275 and hit six home runs with 37 RBIs in 133 games. In 2015, Escobar played 127 games batting .262 with 12 home runs and 58 RBIs. In 2016, Escobar played 105 games batting .236 with 6 home runs and 37 RBIs.

On May 7, 2016, Escobar was placed on the 15-day disabled list due to a left groin strain. He avoided salary arbitration with the Twins on December 3, 2016, by agreeing to a one-year, $2.6 million contract for the 2017 season. In 2017, Escobar batted .254 and set career highs with 21 home runs and 73 RBIs.

Arizona Diamondbacks
On July 27, 2018, Escobar was traded to the Arizona Diamondbacks for minor leaguers Gabriel Maciel, Jhoan Durán, and Ernie De La Trinidad. He had the highest fielding percentage among major league third basemen, at .983.

On October 23, 2018, the Diamondbacks signed Escobar to a three-year contract worth a reported $21 million. In the 2019 season, he hit 35 home runs and 118 RBIs, batting .269/.320/.511. He also led the majors with 10 triples. In 2020, Escobar struggled offensively throughout the shortened MLB season, hitting just .212 with four home runs and 20 RBIs. Escobar bounced back strongly in 2021, posting a .246 average with 22 home runs and 65 RBI’s in 98 games with the Arizona Diamondbacks and earning a trip to the 2021 Major League Baseball All-Star Game.

Milwaukee Brewers

On July 28, 2021, Escobar was traded to the Milwaukee Brewers in exchange for Cooper Hummel and Alberto Ciprian. On October 2, 2021, Escobar collected his 1,000th hit.

New York Mets
On December 1, 2021, Escobar signed a two-year, $20 million contract with the New York Mets.

On June 6, 2022, Escobar hit for the cycle in an 11–5 win over the San Diego Padres, becoming the 11th player in Mets history to accomplish the feat, and the first since Scott Hairston in 2012. He also became the first player to hit for the cycle at Petco Park.

Personal life 
Escobar owns a home in Miami and resides there in the offseason with his wife and five children. , his family was living with him in Arizona. He has four boys and a daughter. The oldest, his daughter, is 17 years old and the youngest was six years old.

Escobar is afraid of cats. During his time with the Diamondbacks, teammates pranked him by startling him with a stuffed cat which gradually became the team's good luck charm.

Escobar frequents the Brazilian steakhouse chain Fogo de Chão. He has taken teammates and team employees to different locations throughout the country. While with the Twins in 2018, he told reporters that his power at the plate came from "a lot of Fogo de Chão." The Milwaukee Journal Sentinel reported in 2021 that Escobar would shout "Fogo power" after hitting home runs. On the tenth anniversary of his Major League debut, the business donated $10,000 to his charity in the form of an oversized check.

See also
 List of Major League Baseball players from Venezuela

References

External links

1989 births
Arizona Diamondbacks players
Birmingham Barons players
Caribes de Anzoátegui players
Charlotte Knights players
Chicago White Sox players
Dominican Summer League White Sox players
Venezuelan expatriate baseball players in the Dominican Republic
Great Falls Voyagers players
Kannapolis Intimidators players
Living people
Major League Baseball players from Venezuela
Major League Baseball infielders
Milwaukee Brewers players
Minnesota Twins players
New York Mets players
Peoria Saguaros players
Rochester Red Wings players
Tiburones de La Guaira players
Venezuelan expatriate baseball players in the United States
Venezuelan Summer League Orioles/White Sox players
Winston-Salem Dash players
Major League Baseball third basemen
People from Villa de Cura
2023 World Baseball Classic players